Bottle tree or bottle-tree may refer to:
Adenium obesum subsp. socotranum, (Apocynaceae), of Socotra
 Adansonia species, the baobabs;
 Adansonia gregorii (the boab)
 Pachypodium lealii, (Apocynaceae), the bottle tree of Namibia and Angola;
 The genus Moringa, (Moringaceae), of the Madagascar spiny thickets and elsewhere;
 Brachychiton species, (Malvaceae), of Australia;
 Ceiba species, the floss silk tree or palo borracho of South America.
"Cavanillesia platanifolia" (Malvaceae) of South America.
 Several genera of the Caricaceae have the habit of a "bottle tree" 
 An artificial tree made of glass bottles, usually of colored glass.  Associated with Hoodoo and primarily found in the Southern United States; see Hoodoo (folk magic)#Bottle Tree